Eduardo Gudiño Kieffer (November 2, 1935 – September 20, 2002) was an Argentine writer.

Biography 
Kieffer was born on November 2, 1935 in Esperanza, Santa Fe in Argentina. He was the son of writer Luis Gudiño Kramer. On his mother side, he is related to Argentinean painter Sebastian Spreng.

He was part of the Latin American literature boom of the 1960s. He graduated as a lawyer at the Universidad del Litoral in Santa Fe but never practiced law. He wrote novels, essays, short stories, children's books, scripts and theatre plays. He was also a renowned journalist. For many years he was a columnist for the Culture page of the newspaper La Nación. His books have been translated into many languages. 

He was also part of the jury in many literary contests. His main theme was Buenos Aires, and he was named "Ciudadano Ilustre de la Ciudad" (Distinguished Citizen of Buenos Aires).    

He was married to Beatriz Trento and later divorced, they had three children. He died in Buenos Aires on September 20, 2002.

Works

Novels

Essays 
Short stories' collections: Fabulario (1960)

Manual para nativos pensantes (1985) 	
A Buenos Aires (1986)

Scripts 
Vení conmigo (1972)
La hora de María y el pájaro de oro (1975)
Desde el abismo (1980)

References 	 

1935 births
2002 deaths
People from Esperanza, Santa Fe
Argentine male writers
Argentine people of German descent
Illustrious Citizens of Buenos Aires